Fort Belgica is a 17th-century fort in Banda Neira, Banda Islands, Maluku Islands (the Moluccas), Indonesia; administratively in Central Maluku Regency, Maluku. The fort acted as a fortification system for the islands of Banda which was the only place in the world during that period where nutmeg was produced.

History

Before Fort Belgica, there was a 16th-century Portuguese fort standing on a hill in Banda Neira. On September 4, 1611, Pieter Both, the first Governor-General of the Dutch East Indies, instructed the construction of a new fort to fortify the hill which dominated the original Dutch fortress, Fort Nassau. This fort was to be named either Belgica or Nederland, and it became Fort Belgica. Fort Belgica was a modest square fort on top of a hill. In 1662, Jan Pieterszoon Coen ordered the renovation of the original fort, so it was replaced with a more solid redoubt that could accommodate 40 men.

By the mid-seventeenth century earthquakes, the tropical monsoonal climate, and poor original construction materials and techniques had resulted in the structure becoming dilapidated. In 1667, Governor Cornelis Speelman instructed Engineer Adriaan de Leeuw to redesign and reconstruct the fort. The result was the present "castle", the major modification works started in 1672 and was completed by 1673.  The new Fort Belgica was built from stone shipped to the island. The new design consisted of a low outer pentagonal structure with five angled corner bastions and a higher inner pentagon with five tall circular towers. It is the only fort of this kind throughout the Banda Islands.

Despite over 300,000 Guilders spent on the modifications, an armament of 50 guns and a garrison of 400 men Fort Belgica surrendered to a British fleet in 1796 without a shot fired. Returned to Dutch control in 1803, it was again taken by the British in 1810, when it was stormed by Captain Cole and his men.

Partially demolished in 1904, it was incompletely rebuilt in 1919. In 1991, following the order of General Benny Moerdani, at the time the Minister of Defense and Security of Indonesia, the fort was thoroughly restored.

Layout
Fort Belgica sits on top of a hill on the southwestern part of the island Banda Neira. The fort overlooks Fort Nassau, lower on the foot of the hill to the south.

Fort Belgica is pentagonal in form. It consists of a low outer pentagonal structure and a higher inner pentagonal structure. A stairs access on the southernmost wall of the outer pentagon provides the sole point of entry to the fort. The lower pentagonal structure is equipped with five bastions, from the left-hand side of the access point: Galge punt, Moorsche punt, Leugenaar punt, Metaale punt, and Klokke punt, each equipped with a bartizan. The higher inner pentagonal structure housed several rooms which were arranged surrounding a pentagonal-shaped inner courtyard. Stairs in one of these rooms provide access to the top level.

World Heritage Status
In January 2015, Belgica Fort was added to the UNESCO World Heritage Tentative List as part of the Historic and Marine Landscape of the Banda Islands.

See also

Citations

References

Bibliography

 
 
 
 
 

Dutch East Indies
Dutch East India Company
World Heritage Sites in Indonesia
Belgica
Buildings and structures in Maluku (province)
Buildings and structures completed in 1611
Tourist attractions in Maluku (province)
1611 establishments in the Dutch Empire